"My Little Chickadee" was the last chart entry for The Foundations. It was a minor hit in the US in 1969.  In Canada, it reached #68.
It was not released as a single in the UK.

Releases
 "My Little Chickadee" / "Solomon Grundy" - Uni 55137

References

1969 singles
The Foundations songs
Songs written by Tony Macaulay
Songs written by John Macleod (songwriter)
Uni Records singles
1969 songs